Taha Shariati Khameneh (born 3 March 2000) is an Iranian footballer who plays as centre back for the Persian Gulf Pro League club Naft Masjed Soleyman.

International career

Youth
Shariati scored a goal in the 2017 FIFA U-17 World Cup against Costa Rica.

International 
Iran U16
 AFC U-16 Championship runner-up: 2016

References

2000 births
Living people
Iranian footballers
Persian Gulf Pro League players
Saipa F.C. players
Naft Masjed Soleyman F.C. players
Association football defenders
Iran youth international footballers